Basadi-ye Hajj Barun (also Romanized as Bāşadī-ye Ḩājj Bārūn; also known as Bāsadi, Bāşedī, and Bāseydī) is a village in Howmeh-ye Sharqi Rural District, in the Central District of Ramhormoz County, Khuzestan Province, Iran. At the 2006 census, its population was 890, in 192 families.

References 

Populated places in Ramhormoz County